Bjørn Thomas Åhrén (born February 4, 1966 in Strömsund, Sweden) is a Sámi-Norwegian politician. He was a member of the Sámi Parliament of Norway from 2013–2017 and is currently a representative of the south Sámi constituency and will remain in this role until 2021.

Åhrén is a representative in the Norwegian Sámi Association and was a member of the Sámi Parliamentary council from 2013–2016. While he sat on the Sámi council, Nora Marie Bransfjell took his place in parliament as a deputy. Åhrén currently works as Technical Manager in Namdalseid.

Thomas Åhrén has a doctorate of engineering Luleå University of Technology.

References

External links 
Sametinget - Bjørn Thomas Åhrén(In Norwegian)

Norwegian Sámi politicians
1966 births
Living people